Burak Öksüz (born 25 January 1996), is a Turkish professional footballer who plays as a centre-back for Hatayspor.

Professional career
A youth product of Çaykurspor, Ankaraspor, and Ankaragücü, Öksüz began his early career with various pro and semi-pro teams in Turkey. On 10 July 2021, he transferred to Hatayspor. He made his professional debut with Hatayspor in a 1–1 Süper Lig tie with Kasımpaşa on 14 August 2021.

References

External links
 

1996 births
Living people
Sportspeople from Rize
Turkish footballers
Sakaryaspor footballers
Hatayspor footballers
Süper Lig players
TFF First League players
TFF Second League players
Association football defenders